Olga Beliaeva or Olga Fomicheva (born 18 March 1985) is a Russian water polo player. At the 2008 and 2012 Summer Olympics, she competed for the Russia women's national water polo team in the women's event. She won the gold medal at the 2006 European Championship in Belgrade, Serbia. She holds the title of Honoured Master of Sport in the Russian Federation.

Personal
She is married with Dmitry. She graduated from St. Petersburg State University of Economics where she studied economics and management in petrol, gas and chemical complexes. In October 2013 she took part in the Olympic torch relay for the 2014 Winter Olympics in Sochi.

See also
 List of World Aquatics Championships medalists in water polo

References

External links
 

Russian female water polo players
1985 births
Living people
Olympic water polo players of Russia
Water polo players at the 2012 Summer Olympics
People from Volgodonsk
World Aquatics Championships medalists in water polo
Universiade medalists in water polo
Universiade gold medalists for Russia
Medalists at the 2013 Summer Universiade
Sportspeople from Rostov Oblast
21st-century Russian women